Hobart is an extinct town in Lincoln County, in the U.S. state of Missouri. The GNIS classifies it as a populated place.

A post office called Hobart was established in 1897, and remained in operation until 1903. The community has the name of Garret Hobart, 24th Vice President of the United States.

References

Ghost towns in Missouri
Former populated places in Lincoln County, Missouri